Michael Healy may refer to:

 Michael A. Healy (1839–1904), U.S. Revenue Cutter Service officer
 Michael Healy (statistician) (1923–2016), British statistician
 Mike Healy (Oz), a fictional character in the HBO show Oz
 Michael D. Healy (born 1926), U.S. Army general
 Michael Healy (hurler) (born 1978), Irish hurler
 Michael Healy (artist) (1871–1941), Irish stained glass artist
 Michael Healy (politician) (born 1964), Australian politician
 Michael Healy-Rae (born 1967), Irish politician, Teachta Dála for the Kerry constituency (from 2016)

See also
 Michael Healey, Canadian playwright and actor